Bere is a surname. Notable people with the surname include:

Jason Bere (born 1971), former Major League Baseball pitcher
Justin Bere, British architect
Rennie Montague Bere (1907–1991), British mountaineer, naturalist and nature conservationist
Richard Beere or Bere (died 1524), English Benedictine abbot of Glastonbury, diplomat and scholar
Thomas Bere (disambiguation)